Daniela Simian Bulaich   is an Argentine volleyball player. She is part of the Argentina women's national volleyball team. She competed at the 2020 Summer Olympics.

Awards

Individuals

 2021 South American Championship – "Best Outside Spiker"

References

1997 births
Living people
Argentine women's volleyball players
Olympic volleyball players of Argentina
Volleyball players at the 2020 Summer Olympics
Sportspeople from Avellaneda
South American Games gold medalists for Argentina
Competitors at the 2018 South American Games